Chicago FC United, commonly called FC United, is an American soccer club in the Chicago metropolitan area. FC United fields youth teams for boys and girls, and a semi-professional team in USL League Two, the fourth-tier of American soccer.

Youth and Academy Programs 
Chicago FC United, founded in 2003, is an elite youth soccer program located in suburban Chicago. The club also operates Trevians Soccer Club and Chicago Magic. FC United youth teams play in local, regional, and national leagues, and its academy teams are founding members of Girls Academy, and MLS Next.

The primary home field is located at Vernon Hills Athletic Complex. FC United co-invested in 2019 with the Vernon Hills Park District to install synthetic turf on three soccer fields. The club operates tournaments in the Chicago area, under the moniker Soccer Events Group, including the Labor Day weekend Chicago Cup.

Soccer Wire, an online publication that ranks the top youth clubs in America, ranks FC United the #30 boys club as of June 2021, and the #31 girls club as of September 2022. In 2021, the U-19 Boys Pre-Academy Red team won the USYS National Championship.

USL League Two 

In 2017, FC United added a semi-professional team in the PDL, now the USL League Two, replacing the departing Chicago Fire Premier, after the Fire decided to relinquish their ties to the PDL.

Season Results

USL Honors 
USL PDL Central Conference Champions 2018
USL League Two Great Lakes Division Champions 2019
USL League Two Heartland Division Champions 2022

Ownership 
FC United is owned by SMP Holdings (Sports Made Personal), led by founder and CEO Chad Gruen. SMP also operates Lacrosse America and Team ONE Lacrosse. Team ONE Lacrosse merged with SMP in 2011.

In June 2022, SMP Holdings was acquired by 3Step Sports, a nationwide youth sports operator.

References

External links 
 

Association football clubs established in 2003
USL League Two teams
Chicago Fire FC
Reserve soccer teams in the United States
2003 establishments in Illinois